UPB may refer to:

 Union of Poles in Belarus
 Universal Powerline Bus, a proprietary home automation protocol (2003)
 Universidad Pontificia Bolivariana
 University of Paderborn
 University of Pittsburgh at Bradford
 University of the Philippines Baguio
 University POLITEHNICA of Bucharest

Upb may refer to:
 Unpentbium, an unsynthesized chemical element with atomic number 152 and symbol Upb

See also
 UBP (disambiguation)